Jere Locke Beasley (born December 12, 1935) is an American attorney and politician; he served as acting governor of Alabama from June 5 to July 7, 1972. His law firm has been noted nationally for winning major awards for its clients; among them was an $11.8 billion punitive damage award against ExxonMobil in 2003.

Early life, education and marriage
Beasley was born in 1935 in Tyler, Texas, the son of Browder Locke and Florence (née Camp) Beasley. He was raised in Clayton, Alabama, where his father ran a small grocery store.

Beasley received a Bachelor of Science degree from Auburn University and in 1958 married Sara Baker. He earned a Juris Doctor from the University of Alabama School of Law in 1962.

Career 
He worked for various law firms until he opened his own practice in 1965.

Alabama politics 
In 1970 Beasley won the first round of the Democratic primary for lieutenant governor but he failed to win a majority. He won the runoff.

He was serving as 22nd Lieutenant Governor when Governor George Corley Wallace was shot and severely injured in an assassination attempt in Laurel, Maryland, on May 15, 1972. Since Wallace was out-of-state for more than 20 days, recovering in a Maryland hospital, the Alabama Constitution required that the lieutenant governor take over temporarily as acting governor.

In 1974, Beasley faced a challenge from Charles Woods, who finished first in the primary. Beasley, like in 1970, won the runoff. He sought the nomination for governor in 1978, placing fifth.

In 2009, Beasley served as the campaign chair for Alabama gubernatorial candidate Artur Davis.

Private practice

After a strong but unsuccessful push to win the governor's office during the 1978 election, Beasley left politics. He and his wife, Sara, were at peace with the outcome. Determined to pay all the political campaign's financial obligations, the Beasleys realized it was time for Jere Beasley to return to practicing law. With no offers on the table from existing firms, the option they were left with was for Beasley to start his own, new firm. After seeking the advice of his friend and mentor, the esteemed civil rights leader and Federal Judge Frank M. Johnson, Beasley was clear about his calling and the purpose of the firm. His new practice would be a safe harbor for those who need help. He would do what many lawyers refused to do at the time – take on powerful corporate interests on behalf of consumers and hard-working employees, or “the little man” as others have described.

Founded on the principle of “helping those who need it most,” the firm was established to provide legal service to both individuals and businesses who have been wronged by no act of their own. That principle still serves as the bedrock for the firm's work. The firm, which is known today as Beasley, Allen, Crow, Methvin, Portis & Miles, P.C., has grown to more than 85 attorneys in Atlanta, Georgia; Dallas, Texas; Mobile, Alabama; and Montgomery, Alabama and more than 200 support staff including full-time nurses, investigators, computer specialists, technologists, a marketing department, and a comprehensive trial graphics team. On Jan. 7, 2019, Beasley Allen celebrated its 40th anniversary.

Beasley is noted as a trial lawyer, and his firm has a national reputation for winning major awards for its clients.

Notable cases
Beasley's law firm has handed the following major cases:
 September 1993 – Tractor and heavy equipment manufacturer Kubota agreed to pay the family of 67-year-old retired farmer Durwood Spivey $10 million after the B-7100 Kubota tractor he was riding overturned, crushing him under the 2,500-pound weight of the machine. Kubota had not equipped the tractor with a rollover protection structure, despite such protection being available to the tractor industry since the 1950s.
 November 2003 – A Montgomery County jury ordered Exxon Mobil Corporation to pay the State of Alabama a record $11.8 billion in punitive damages  as well as an additional $103 million in compensatory damages for intentionally and willfully underpaying royalties on natural gas from the Mobile Bay field. Exxon appealed and gained a reduction in the award to $3.6 billion.
 November 2007 – Pharmaceutical company Merck & Co announced it would pay $4.85 billion to resolve claims that its anti-inflammatory drug Vioxx caused heart attacks, strokes and sudden cardiac death. The Vioxx settlement remains the largest pharmaceutical settlement in history.
 October 2013 – An Oklahoma City jury ordered Toyota Motor Corp. to pay Jean Bookout and the family of deceased passenger Barbara Schwartz $3 million in compensatory damages and an additional $1.5 million in punitive damages over claims that an electronic defect in Bookout's 2005 Camry caused it to accelerate unintentionally and crash, seriously injuring Bookout and killing Schwartz.
 July 2015 - Beasley Allen represented the State of Alabama in a landmark agreement in principle with BP for damages caused by the April 2010 Deepwater Horizon oil spill in the Gulf of Mexico. The agreement tagged the State of Alabama to receive more than $2 billion in total, including compensation for economic losses resulting from the spill, natural resource damages, and an apportionment of Clean Water Act civil fines and penalties. The agreement is part of a larger agreement that includes the Federal Government, four other Gulf States impacted by the oil spill –Louisiana, Texas, Mississippi and Florida – and local government entities. The deal is estimated to be worth approximately $18.7 billion, and should smash previous records as the largest environmental settlement in U.S. history.

Community involvement

Beasley is actively involved various civic endeavors, including the American Cancer Society, American Heart Association, Lions Club and the Fellowship of Christian Athletes.

He currently serves as a member of the Staff Parish Relations for St. James United Methodist Church.

In 2006, Beasley was named “Citizen of the Year” by the March of Dimes.

In January 2010, Beasley was selected as the recipient of the Montgomery Sunrise Rotary Club’s Commitment to Service Award, recognizing his dedication to helping others and improving the community and the River Region.

In January 2020, Beasley was presented with the Montgomery County Bar Association (MCBA) Service & Achievement Award. The award was created to recognize Montgomery lawyers who have distinguished themselves through their exemplary service to the local community and bar. The honor is presented to a lawyer who demonstrates the highest standard of professionalism and is respected for outstanding legal ability.

In 2018, Beasley Allen Law Firm was awarded the Montgomery Area Chamber of Commerce's Montgomery Impact Maker Award for its revitalization efforts in downtown Montgomery and its overall contribution to the local community. The firm was instrumental in securing the Montgomery Biscuits minor league baseball team and for providing the land for the Montgomery Riverwalk Stadium, which was respectfully constructed by preserving a large section of the original historic building and built on land owned by the firm. When the stadium opened in 2004, it served as a catalyst for the revitalization of downtown.

In 2018, the firm was also awarded the Landmarks Foundation of Montgomery's James L. Loeb Preservation Award for its contribution to preserving Montgomery's historic resources and heritage, specifically capitalizing on the distinctive architectural character of lower Commerce Street. The firm has purchased and renovated several buildings along Commerce Street, which was added to the National Register of Historic Places in 1979 with boundary expansions in 1982 and 1987.

Electoral history 
Democratic primary for Lieutenant Governor, 1970
 Jere Beasley – 256,081 (29.03%)
 Hugh Morrow – 185,333 (21.01%)
 Tom Radney – 163,462 (18.53%)
 Joe Money – 100,131 (11.35%)
 Jack Giles – 81,789 (9.27%)
 Joe Goodwyn – 75,085 (8.51%)
 James Gullate – 10,627 (1.21%)
 Jay Thomas – 9,631 (1.09%)

Democratic runoff for Lieutenant Governor
 Jere Beasley – 572,258 (57.78%)
 Hugh Morrow – 418,228 (42.23%)

Race for Lieutenant Governor, 1970
 Jere Beasley (D) – 589,618 (72.26%)
 Robert French (R) – 126,506 (15.50%)
 Isaiah Hayes (Alabama National Democrat) – 92,176 (11.30%)
 John G. Crommelin (Independent) – 7,678 (0.94%)

Democratic primary for Lieutenant Governor, 1974
 Charles Woods – 310,351 (38.68%)
 Jere Beasley (inc.) – 308,182 (38.41%)
 Richard Dominick – 150,455 (18.75%)
 Ron Creel – 25,392 (3.17%)
 Coleman Brown – 7,943 (0.99%)

Democratic runoff for Lieutenant Governor
 Jere Beasley (inc.) – 393,077 (56.10%)
 Charles Woods – 307,643 (43.90%)

Race for Lieutenant Governor, 1974
 Jere Beasley (D) (inc.) – 433,495 (72.06%)
 Don Collins (R) – 153,814 (25.57%)
 Edna L. Bowling (Prohibition) – 9,857 (1.64%)
 John Watts (Independent, write-in) – 4,387 (0.73%)

Democratic primary for Governor, 1978
 Fob James – 256,196 (28.47%)
 Bill Baxley – 210,089 (23.35%)
 Albert Brewer – 193,479 (21.50%)
 Sid McDonald – 143,930 (15.99%)
 Jere Beasley – 77,202 (8.58%)
 K.C. Foster – 4,948 (0.55%)
 Horace Howell – 4,730 (0.53%)
 Jim Folsom – 4,632 (0.52%)
 Bob Muncaster – 1,776 (0.20%)
 Shorty Price – 1,396 (0.16%)
 Charles Woods – 700 (0.08%)
 Fred Sandefer – 622 (0.07%)
 Cornelia Wallace – 217 (0.02%)

See also
List of Auburn University people

References

 
 Encyclopedia of Alabama article on Beasley

|-

1935 births
Alabama lawyers
American United Methodists
Auburn University alumni
Democratic Party governors of Alabama
Governors of Alabama
Lieutenant Governors of Alabama
Living people
People from Tyler, Texas
University of Alabama School of Law alumni